Martin J. Oberman is an American government official and attorney who has served as a member of the Surface Transportation Board (STB) since 2019 and as STB chair since 2021. Oberman previously served as the chair of the board of directors at Metra, the Chicago commuter rail system.

From 1975 to 1987, Oberman was a Chicago City Councilman, representing the 43rd Ward from 1975 to 1987. He was also an unsuccessful candidate for Illinois Attorney General in the 1981, 1986, and 1994 elections.

Early life and education

In 1907, Oberman's grandfather brought the Oberman family to Springfield, Illinois, where he opened up a grocery store. Oberman's father, M.D. "Mush" Oberman, was active in Springfield community affairs for 40 years. At the age of 13, Martin Oberman was appointed as a page in the United States House of Representatives. Aside from the Capitol Page School, he attended Springfield's Butler Grade School, Springfield High School, and graduated valedictorian from Culver Military Academy in 1962.

In 1966, he received his B.A. from Yale University, and in 1969, graduated with the Order of the Coif at Wisconsin Law School, where he also served as Note Editor of the University of Wisconsin Law Review.

Public service and politics

Early work 
After nearly three years (1969–1972) as a lawyer with the Chicago firm of Leibman, Williams, Bennett, Baird, and Minow, Oberman became General Counsel to the Illinois Racing Board under Anthony Scariano. Oberman investigated and prosecuted various corrupt racing interests in License revocation proceedings for political payoffs, race-fixing and horse drugging.

Chicago City Council 
In 1975, Oberman was elected Alderman from Chicago's 43rd Ward. He had an adversarial relationship with the Chicago City Council's political majority. In 1979 and again in 1983, he was reelected as Alderman.

Oberman was a member of the minority independent bloc of aldermen. He had a reputation as a reformer, and kept himself distanced from the city' Democratic machine politics.

Oberman, along with fellow independent alderman Dick Simpson, was one of only two aldermen to vote against the resolution appointing Michael Anthony Bilandic to hold the mayoralty after Richard J. Daley's death in office.

From 1983 to 1986, Marty supported Mayor Harold Washington, Chicago's first African American mayor in the era of the Council Wars. He had been a supporter of Washington's mayoral candidacy.

Subsequent career 
After leaving the City Council, Oberman was appointed Chairman of the Shore Protection Commission, which was tasked with doing a complete rehabilitation of Chicago's shoreline to ensure environmental protection.

Oberman ran for Illinois Attorney General in 1982, 1986, and again in 1994.

In November 2013, he took his seat on the board of Metra, the Chicago commuter rail system, as Mayor Rahm Emanuel's appointee.

On July 5, 2018, President Donald Trump announced he was seeking to appoint Oberman to the Democratic vacancy on the United States Surface Transportation Board. He was confirmed to the vacancy on January 3, 2019 by a voice vote in the United States Senate. In January 2019, he began a five-year term on the Surface Transportation Board. In January 2021, he was named the Chairman of the Board by President Biden.

In the 2019 Chicago mayoral election, Oberman endorsed Lori Lightfoot, publicly declaring his support of her candidacy in advance of the first round of the election.

Surface Transportation Board (STB) 
On July 5, 2018, President Donald Trump announced he was seeking to appoint Oberman to the Democratic vacancy on the United States Surface Transportation Board. He was confirmed to the vacancy on January 3, 2019, by a voice vote in the United States Senate. Following Joe Biden's inauguration as President in 2021, Oberman was chosen to serve as chair of the STB.

Family life
Oberman lives in Chicago with his wife Bonnie Oberman, who is the Chicago Director of Facing History and Ourselves.

References

Living people
Yale University alumni
University of Wisconsin Law School alumni
Chicago City Council members
Illinois lawyers
1945 births
Surface Transportation Board personnel